The 2015 Portsmouth City Council election took place on 7 May 2015 to elect members of Portsmouth City Council in England. This was on the same day as other local elections.

Following the elections, the Conservatives remained in control of the council, continuing to govern in a minority administration

Election results

Change in composition 
After the 2015 local election, the  political makeup of the council was as follows: These seats were then next contested in 2019.

Results by ward 
Comparisons for the purpose of determining a gain, hold or loss of a seat, and for all percentage changes, are to the last time these specific seats were up for election in 2011. A "*" indicates that that councillor was re-elected.

References

2015 English local elections
May 2015 events in the United Kingdom
2015
2010s in Hampshire